St Lucia Barracks, Omagh is a former military base in Omagh, Northern Ireland.

History
The War Office leased the  site from the Archdale family on 10 April 1875 for sixty pounds per annum. The lease was made for 999 years or until the War Office ceased to use it for military purposes or sublet, assigned the premises for use other than military. The original lease is still held by the Ministry of Defence. The site was acquired as part of the Cardwell Reforms which encouraged the localisation of British military forces. The barracks became the depot for the 27th (Inniskilling) Regiment of Foot and the 108th (Madras Infantry) Regiment of Foot. Following the Childers Reforms, the 27th and 108th regiments amalgamated to form the Royal Inniskilling Fusiliers with its depot in the barracks in 1881.

In 1924 the barracks also became the depot of the Royal Irish Fusiliers. An Auxiliary Territorial Service camp was established on the site during the Second World War and Lisanelly Camp was built on an adjacent site around this time.

In October 1954, an attempted IRA raid on the barracks to capture weapons failed, with five soldiers and two IRA men injured. Eight men were arrested, and convicted, with sentences of 10–12 years imprisonment.

The base was the subject of a botched proxy bomb attack on 24 October 1990, when the main charge of the bomb failed to explode. The barracks closed in 2007 as part of the demilitarisation of Northern Ireland according to the Good Friday Agreement. Eventually, an environmentally friendly PSNI station was built on the grounds next to the existing St Lucia barracks site in 2010.

References

Sources

Omagh
Barracks in Northern Ireland
Military history of County Tyrone
Police Service of Northern Ireland